Darko Spalević (Serbian Cyrillic: Дарко Спалевић; born 24 March 1977) is a Serbian professional footballer who plays as a striker.

Over the course of his journeyman career, Spalević scored over 150 competitive goals in six countries, having his most prolific seasons after the age of thirty.

Club career
Born in Vučitrn, Spalević started out at Trepča, before transferring to Priština in 1998. He stayed there for only one season. After a short stint at Bane in the fall of 1999, Spalević moved to Milicionar, spending there the following year and a half.

In the summer of 2001, Spalević joined Red Star Belgrade. He failed to make an impact at the club in a year and a half, before switching to Bulgarian club Cherno More Varna. In the summer of 2003, Spalević moved to another Bulgarian club Lokomotiv Plovdiv. He won the national championship title in the 2003–04 season.

In the following three seasons, Spalević played for Russian club Dynamo Makhachkala (2004), Hungarian club Zalaegerszeg (2005), and Chinese club Henan Jianye (2006), but without notable achievements.

In early 2007, Spalević moved to Bosnia and Herzegovina and signed with Slavija Sarajevo. He spent the next two and a half years there, becoming the Premier League top scorer in 2008, and 2009. Spalević also helped the club win the Bosnia and Herzegovina Cup in the 2008–09 campaign. He subsequently switched to Olimpik, before returning to Slavija in early 2010.

In July 2010, Spalević returned to Serbia and joined First League club Radnički Kragujevac. He was their top scorer in the 2010–11 season with 19 league goals, thus leading them to promotion to the SuperLiga. In the following 2011–12 season, Spalević became the SuperLiga top scorer with 19 goals. He stayed at the club for two more years, despite having some disagreements with the club's president, helping the side remain in the top flight.

After leaving Radnički, Spalević moved to fellow SuperLiga club Donji Srem in June 2014, penning a one-year contract. He however failed to help them avoid relegation from the top flight in the 2014–15 season. In July 2015, Spalević officially returned to his former club Slavija Sarajevo on a one-year deal.

In July 2016, Spalević returned to Radnički Kragujevac. He helped the side win the Serbian League West in his comeback season, thus earning promotion back to the Serbian First League.

International career
In December 1999, Spalević played for the FR Yugoslavia U23s in a 0–1 friendly loss against Argentina.

Career statistics

Honours

Player
Lokomotiv Plovdiv 
Bulgarian A Group: 2003–04

Slavija Sarajevo 
Bosnian Cup: 2008–09

Radnički Kragujevac 
Serbian League West: 2016–17

Individual
Awards
Serbian SuperLiga Team of the Season: 2011–12

Performance 
Bosnian Premier League Top Goalscorer: 2007–08 (18 goals), 2008–09 (17 goals)
Serbian First League Top Goalscorer: 2010–11 (13 goals) 
Serbian SuperLiga Top Goalscorer: 2011–12 (19 goals)

References

External links
 HLSZ profile
 
 Futebol Mundial profile
 

Association football forwards
First Professional Football League (Bulgaria) players
China League One players
Expatriate footballers in Bosnia and Herzegovina
Expatriate footballers in Bulgaria
Expatriate footballers in China
Expatriate footballers in Hungary
Expatriate footballers in Russia
First League of Serbia and Montenegro players
FK Bane players
FK Milicionar players
FK Olimpik players
FK Radnički 1923 players
FK Slavija Sarajevo players
FK Trepča players
Henan Songshan Longmen F.C. players
FC Prishtina players
Kosovo Serbs
Nemzeti Bajnokság I players
Sportspeople from Vushtrri
PFC Cherno More Varna players
PFC Lokomotiv Plovdiv players
Premier League of Bosnia and Herzegovina players
Red Star Belgrade footballers
Serbian expatriate footballers
Serbian expatriate sportspeople in Bosnia and Herzegovina
Serbian expatriate sportspeople in Bulgaria
Serbian expatriate sportspeople in China
Serbian expatriate sportspeople in Hungary
Serbian expatriate sportspeople in Russia
Serbian First League players
Serbian footballers
Serbian SuperLiga players
Zalaegerszegi TE players
1977 births
Living people
FC Dynamo Makhachkala players